Thpong District is a district (srok) located in Kampong Speu Province in central Cambodia.

Geography
The district is located in central Cambodia. Neighbouring districts are (from the east clockwise) Odongk, Samraong Tong and Aoral. To the north are the districts Tuek Phos and Sameakki Mean Chey of Kampong Chhnang Province.

Administration
Thpong District is subdivided into 7 communes (khum)

References

Districts of Kampong Speu province